Baldé is a surname of West African origin. Some notable people with the surname include:

 Abdoulaye Baldé (footballer) (born 1986), French football (soccer) striker
 Abdoulaye Baldé (politician) (born 1964), Senegalese politician
 Adul Baldé (born 1989), Bissau-Guinean footballer
 Aldair Adulai Djaló Baldé (born 1992), Bissau-Guinean footballer
 Algassimou Baldé (born 1984), Guinean footballer with AS Cannes in France
 Amido Baldé (born 1991), Portuguese professional footballer
 Bacar Baldé (born 1992),  Bissau-Guinean footballer
 Bobo Baldé (born 1975), French-born Guinean professional footballer
 Cheick Sidia Baldé (born 1983), Guinean footballer
 Elladj Baldé (born 1990),  Canadian figure skater
 Elves Baldé (born 1999), Bissau-Guinean born Portuguese footballer
 Fatumata Djau Baldé, Bissau-Guinean politician and former Minister of Foreign Affairs
 Habib Baldé (born 1985), French-born Guinean footballer
 Hélder Baldé (born 1998), Portuguese footballer
 Ibrahima Baldé (born 1989), Senegalese footballer
 Ibraima Baldé (born 1986), Bissau-Guinean footballer
 Jean-François Baldé (born 1950), former Grand Prix motorcycle road racer from France
 Keita Baldé (born 1995), Senegalese footballer
 Mama Samba Baldé (born 1995), Bissau-Guinean footballer
 Mamadi Baldé (born 1978), Bissau-Guinean footballer
 Mamadou Baldé (born 1985), Senegalese football central midfielder
 Ousmane Baldé (died 1971), Guinean economist and politician
 Ousmane Baldé (footballer) (born 1980), Guinean footballer
 Romário Baldé (born 1996) Bissau-Guinean born Portuguese footballer
 Seydina Baldé (born 1976), French martial artist, actor, and stunt choreographer
 Sirah Baldé, Guinean writer and teacher
 William Baldé, singer-songwriter and composer born in Guinea

See also 
 Jakob Balde, German scholar
 Balde, San Luis

Surnames of African origin